Frank Exton Lennard (24 April 1892 – 25 February 1973) was a Conservative then a Progressive Conservative party member of the House of Commons of Canada. He was born in Dundas, Ontario and became a merchant and textile dyer by career.

He was first elected at the Wentworth riding in the 1935 general election after serving 5 years in the Dundas town council. After serving his first term in Parliament, he was defeated there in the 1940 election by Ellis Hopkins Corman. Lennard returned to the House of Commons when he won the seat back in the 1945 election and won consecutive elections until he left federal politics in 1962 after completing his final term, the 24th Parliament. He died at Dundas in 1973 and was buried at Grove Cemetery. His wife died in 1986.

United Nations 
Lennard was also a one time Canadian delegate to the United Nations. In 1957, then Prime Minister John Diefenbaker had appointed Lennard for the position of Canadian delegate in New York at the U.N general Assembly. He had this position for three months.

References

External links
 
 

1892 births
Members of the House of Commons of Canada from Ontario
Conservative Party of Canada (1867–1942) MPs
Progressive Conservative Party of Canada MPs
1973 deaths